A computer-animated film is a feature film that has been computer-animated to appear three-dimensional. While traditional 2D animated films are now made primarily with the help of computers, the technique to render realistic 3D computer graphics (CG) or 3D computer-generated imagery (CGI), is unique to computers.

This is a list of theatrically released feature films that are entirely computer-animated.

Released films
Release date listed is the first public theatrical screening of the completed film. This may mean that the dates listed here may not be representative of when the film came out in a particular country.

The country or countries listed reflects the places where the production companies for each title are based. This means that the countries listed for a film might not reflect the location where the film was produced or the countries where the film received a theatrical release. If a title is a multi-country production, the country listed first corresponds with the production company that had the most significant role in the film's creation.

Upcoming films

See also

 History of animation
 Timeline of CGI in film and television
 List of animated feature films
 List of stop motion films
 Academy Award for Best Animated Feature

References

External links
 List of animated features theatrically released in the United States (with US release dates)

Computer-animated
Computer-animated

Computer-animated films